Torrock is a sub-prefecture of Mayo-Kebbi Ouest Region in Chad.

References 

Populated places in Chad
)